The 2011–12 Argentine Primera B Nacional was the 26th season of second division professional of football in Argentina. A total of 20 teams competed; the champion and runner-up were promoted to Argentine Primera División.

Club information

Standings

Promotion/relegation playoff Legs Primera División-Primera B Nacional
The 3rd and 4th placed of the table played with the 18th and the 17th placed of the Relegation Table of 2011–12 Primera División.

|-
!colspan="5"|Relegation/promotion playoff 1

|-
!colspan="5"|Relegation/promotion playoff 2

San Martín (SJ) remained in the Primera División after a 0-0 aggregate tie by virtue of a "sports advantage". In case of a tie in goals, the team from the Primera División gets to stay in it.
San Lorenzo remained in the Primera División by winning the playoff.

Results

Relegation
Clubs with an indirect affiliation with Argentine Football Association are relegated to the Torneo Argentino A, while clubs directly affiliated face relegation to Primera B Metropolitana. Clubs with direct affiliation are all from Greater Buenos Aires, with the exception of Rosario Central, Newell's Old Boys, Central Córdoba and Argentino de Rosario, all from Rosario, and Unión and Colón from Santa Fe. The bottom two teams of this table face relegation regardless of their affiliation status. Apart from them, the bottom teams of each affiliation face promotion/relegation playoffs against Torneo Argentino A and Primera B Metropolitana's "Reducido" (reduced tournaments) champions. The Reducidos are played after those leagues' champions are known.

Updated to games played on June 23, 2012.

Relegation Playoff Legs

|-
!colspan="5"|Relegation/promotion playoff 1 (Direct affiliation vs. Primera B Metropolitana)

|-
!colspan="5"|Relegation/promotion playoff 2 (Indirect affiliation vs. Torneo Argentino A)

Nueva Chicago was promoted to 2012–13 Primera B Nacional by winning the playoff and Chacarita Juniors was relegated to 2012–13 Primera B Metropolitana.
Crucero del Norte was promoted to 2012–13 Primera B Nacional by winning the playoff and Guillermo Brown was relegated to 2012–13 Torneo Argentino A.

Season statistics

Top scorers

See also
2011–12 in Argentine football

References

External links

2011–12 in Argentine football leagues
Primera B Nacional seasons
Arg
Arg